Rabiabad may refer to:

Rabiabad, Lorestan
Rabiabad, South Khorasan
Rabiabad, Yazd